Lomas de Zamora is a partido (district) of Buenos Aires Province, Argentina, and part of the Greater Buenos Aires urban agglomeration. 

The local government's seat is at the city of Lomas de Zamora.

Districts
 Banfield
 Llavallol
 Lomas de Zamora (capital)
 Temperley
 San José
 Turdera
 Villa Centenario
 Villa Fiorito (formerly in Lanús Partido)

References

External links

 
 Lomas Athletic Club - Official Site.
 Universidad Nacional de Lomas de Zamora Website
 La Unión newspaper
 Lomas de Zamora website

 
1861 establishments in Argentina
Partidos of Buenos Aires Province